The Frustrated is the ninth album by Japanese rock band Glay. It was released on March 24, 2004, and peaked at #2 at Oricon charts, with 241,485 copies sold. It was certified Platinum by the Recording Industry Association of Japan (RIAJ).

Track listing 
Highcommunications - 4:13
The Frustrated - 3:47
All I Want - 4:30
Beautiful Dreamer - 4:30
Blast - 4:23
 - 5:41
 - 4:18
 - 7:23
Billionaire Champagne Miles Away - 3:38
Coyote, Colored Darkness - 3:36
Bugs in My Head - 3:43
Runaway Runaway - 4:11
Street Life - 5:43
 - 5:20

References 
 The Frustrated page at Oricon

External links 
 Glay Official Site

2004 albums
Glay albums